CS Arcada Galați is a volleyball club based in Galați, Romania, that competes in the Divizia A1, the top tier of Romanian volleyball.

Honours

Domestic 
 Divizia A1 
 Winners (4): 2019, 2020, 2021, 2022
 Runners-up (1): 2018  
 Third place (2): 2016, 2017
 Cupa României 
 Winners (2): 2017, 2022
 Runners-up (3): 2018, 2019, 2023
 Supercupa României 
 Winners (2): 2017, 2019

Team

Current squad
Squad for the 2018-19 season     
  Vlad Cuciureanu
  Adrian Fehér
  Liviu Cristudor
  Miloš Terzić
  Nemanja Čubrilo
  Ivan Raič
  Tiago Gatiboni Wesz
  Paul Sanderson
  Ángel Pérez
  José Manuel Carrasco Angulo 
  Julian Bissette
  Alexander Kullo

See also
 Romania men's national volleyball team

References

External links 
CEV profile
Profile on Volei Romania 

Romanian volleyball clubs 
Sport in Galați